The 2010 Svenska Cupen final took place on 13 November 2010 at Söderstadion in Stockholm. The match was contested by Superettan side Hammarby IF and Allsvenskan side Helsingborgs IF. Hammarby, who never has won the cup, played their first final since 1983. Helsingborg's latest title was four years earlier in 2006, their third cup title of all time.

A late strike in the 80th minute by Rasmus Jönsson secured the cup title for Helsingborg and ended a very successful season for the Scanian team. A week before, they had also finished runners-up in Allsvenskan.

Road to the Final

 Helsingborgs IF entered the tournament in the third round.
 Square brackets [ ] represent the opposition's division.

Match details

See also
2010 Svenska Cupen

References

External links
Svenska Cupen at svenskfotboll.se

2010
Cupen
Helsingborgs IF matches
Hammarby Fotboll matches
Football in Stockholm
November 2010 sports events in Europe
Sports competitions in Stockholm